
Kazimierza County is a unit of territorial administration and local government (powiat) in Świętokrzyskie Voivodeship, south-central Poland. It came into being on January 1, 1999, as a result of the Polish local government reforms passed in 1998.

As of 2019 its total population is 33,408, out of which the population of Kazimierza Wielka is 5,550, that of Skalbmierz is 1,285, and the rural population is 26,573.

Neighbouring counties
Kazimierza County is bordered by Pińczów County to the north, Busko County to the north-east, Dąbrowa County to the east, Tarnów County to the south-east, and Proszowice County and Miechów County to the west.

Administrative division
The county is subdivided into five gminas (two urban-rural and three rural). These are listed in the following table, in descending order of population.

References

 
Kazimierza